The Central District of Nur County is a district (bakhsh) in Nur County, Mazandaran Province, Iran. At the 2006 census, its population was 57,530, in 15,342 families.  The District has three cities: Nur, Izadshahr, and Royan. The District has three rural districts (dehestan): Mian Band Rural District, Natel Kenar-e Olya Rural District, and Natel Kenar-e Sofla Rural District.

References 

Nur County
Districts of Mazandaran Province